The Nichols Medal is the annual award to the "best and fairest" player in Australian Rules football competition the Northern Territory Football League in the Northern Territory, Australia. It is named in honour of Joseph W. Nichols , a long time administrator of Australian Rules football in the Northern Territory. The first NTFL "best and fairest" was awarded in 1947, but the first award under the name "Nichols Medal" was made in 1949.

Nichols Medal winners

1946 to 1975

1976 to 2018

References

Australian rules football awards
Awards established in 1949